Rorys Andrés Aragón Espinoza (born 28 June 1982), commonly known as Rorys Aragón, is an Ecuadorian football goalkeeper who currently plays for Barcelona and the Ecuador national team.

Club career
Aragon played club football for Club Sport Emelec from 2001 to 2004 in his home town of Guayaquil, where he impressed in the domestic league as well as international tournaments at club level. He left the club, due to its financial situation and as it was releasing its firm power over the tournament. He then joined El Nacional de Quito from 2004 to 2006, and although he wished to have more playing time, he was often watching from the sidelines, as he failed to dislodge the club's number one goalkeeper, the former national team member Geovanny Ibarra.

He has since then been successful in joining the Belgian team, Standard Liège, although whether he was bought or loaned from Inter Milan remains a mystery. He was Standard's number one goalkeeper.

In a 2008 league match against K.A.A. Gent, he copied the legendary Colombian goalkeeper René Higuita's renowned scorpion kick, paying homage to the once breathtaking move performed last by Higuita in a friendly against England. Aragon was let go on his contract from Liege and recently signed a 2-year contract with Turkish club Diyarbakirspor. He became the first Ecuadorian to play in Süper Lig.

He recently went back to Ecuador and signed for Club Deportivo El Nacional

International career
Aragon originally made a name for himself as a youngster in the unique South American Youth Championship tournament, where his excellent goal keeping abilities were present for South American to see. He was considered Ecuador national team's outstanding player of the tournament, making acrobatic saves and well time dashes and stops. He has been known, however, to make critical comments of his team and for accusing Luis Chiriboga Acosta, the president of the FEF.

Although he has not played in either of Ecuador's FIFA World Cup appearances, he could be considered one of the country's top keepers, and his move to Europe has improved his chances of making more appearances for the Ecuador national team. He made his debut on 25 March 2007 in a friendly against the United States, followed by a game against Mexico. He has recently been recalled to the national team as an emergency replacement for the injured Marcelo Elizaga for upcoming friendly matches against Mexico and Venezuela by the new coach Reinaldo Rueda alongside Máximo Banguera.

Honours
 Standard Liège
 Belgian First Division A: 2007–08, 2008–09
 Belgian Super Cup: 2008

References

External links 

Player profile - standardliege.be
FEF player's card

1982 births
Living people
Sportspeople from Esmeraldas, Ecuador
Ecuadorian footballers
C.S. Emelec footballers
C.D. El Nacional footballers
Standard Liège players
Diyarbakırspor footballers
Barcelona S.C. footballers
Ecuador international footballers
Ecuadorian expatriate footballers
Belgian Pro League players
Süper Lig players
Expatriate footballers in Belgium
Expatriate footballers in Turkey
Ecuadorian expatriate sportspeople in Turkey
Association football goalkeepers